This is a list of mass shootings in the United States that have occurred in 2019. Mass shootings are incidents involving multiple victims of firearm-related violence. The precise inclusion criteria are disputed, and there is no broadly accepted definition.

Gun Violence Archive, a nonprofit research group that tracks shootings and their characteristics in the United States, defines a mass shooting as an incident in which four or more people, excluding the perpetrator(s), are shot in one location at roughly the same time. The Congressional Research Service narrows that definition, limiting it to "public mass shootings," defined by four or more victims killed, excluding any victims who survive. The Washington Post and Mother Jones use similar definitions, with the latter acknowledging that their definition "is a conservative measure of the problem," as many shootings with fewer fatalities occur. The crowdsourced Mass Shooting Tracker project has the most expansive definition, of four or more shot in any incident, including the perpetrator.

There were 434 mass shootings in 2019 that fit the inclusion criteria of this article, resulting in 517 deaths and 1,643 injuries, for a total of 2,160 victims. Compared to the previous year, there were 111 more incidents.

Definitions 
There are many definitions of a mass shooting. Listed roughly from broad to specific:
 Stanford University MSA Data Project: three or more persons shot in one incident, excluding the perpetrator(s), at one location, at roughly the same time. Excluded are shootings associated with organized crime, gangs or drug wars.
 Mass Shooting Tracker: four or more persons shot in one incident, at one location, at roughly the same time.
 Gun Violence Archive/Vox: four or more shot in one incident, excluding the perpetrators, at one location, at roughly the same time.
 Mother Jones: three or more shot and killed in one incident at a public place, excluding the perpetrators.
 The Washington Post: four or more shot and killed in one incident at a public place, excluding the perpetrators.
 ABC News/FBI: four or more shot and killed in one incident, excluding the perpetrators, at one location, at roughly the same time.
 Congressional Research Service: four or more shot and killed in one incident, excluding the perpetrators, at a public place, excluding gang-related killings and those done with a profit-motive.

Only incidents considered mass shootings by at least two of the above sources are listed below.

List 
Parenthetical number indicates the amount of mass shootings that occurred in that city year to date.

Statistics 

According to data compiled by the Associated Press, USA Today, and Northeastern University, the year 2019 saw the highest number of mass killings recorded to date: 475 killed in 441 incidents. Thirty-three of these mass killings, defined here as four or more people killed excluding the perpetrator, involved firearms.

See also 
List of school shootings in the United States (before 2000)
List of school shootings in the United States (2000–present)
List of school shootings in the United States by death toll
Casualty recording

Notes

References

External links 
 Gun Violence Archive Mass Shootings
 Mass Shooting Tracker Mass Shootings
 Mother Jones Mass Shootings
 USA Today Mass Shootings
 Vox Mass Shootings
 Washington Post Mass Shootings
 Active Shooter Incidents in the United States in 2019

 
2019 murders in the United States
Mass shootings in the United States
2019
2019